Peter Inman (writing as P. Inman) is an American poet. He was born in 1947 and raised on Long Island. He graduated from Georgetown University. Since 1980 he worked at the Library of Congress, where he was a union activist (i.e. shop steward, executive officer, union rep and contract negotiator) for Local 2910 of the American Federation of State, County and Municipal Employees (AFSCME). He described his politics as "class-based & socialist". His work appeared in magazines and anthologies including: In the American Tree (edited by Ron Silliman) and From the Other Side of the Century. He lives in Maryland with the poet Tina Darragh.

Selected publications
Platin (Sun & Moon, 1979) 
Ocker (Tuumba, 1982) 
Uneven development (Jimmy's House of Knowledge, 1984) 
Think of one (Potes & Poets, 1986) 
Red shift (Roof, 1988) 
criss cross (Roof, 1994)
Vel (O Books, 1995)
ply (1997)
at. least.(Krupskaya, 1999) 
amounts. to. (Potes & Poets, 2000)
a different table altogether. (Slought Books, 2003) e-book subtitled: P. Inman in Conversation with Roger Farr & Aaron Vidaver.
now /time (Bronze Skull, 2006)
Ad Finitum (if p then q, 2008)
Per Se (Burning Deck, 2012)
Written 1976-2013 (if p then q, 2014)

Audio & CD
Thomas Delio/James Dashow (Capstone Recording 8645, 1997): settings for works by composer Thomas DeLioMusic Text (Capstone Recording 8645, 1999)

Notes

External links
P. Inman Homepage @ Electronic Poetry Center
Author Page @ Krupskaya, the publisher of at.leastPublisher Site @ if p then q, the publisher of Ad Finitum''

1947 births
Living people
American male poets
Language poets
Georgetown University alumni
20th-century American poets
20th-century American male writers
American Federation of State, County and Municipal Employees people
People from Long Island